Sun Machine is the second album by Polish alternative rock band Myslovitz. The album spawned two somewhat beatlesque airplay hits - Z twarzą Marilyn Monroe ("With a Face Like...") and Peggy Brown, the latter being a cover version of a fellow Mysłowice rock band, with lyrics originally by the Irish "national bard" Turlough O'Carolan (in a translation by the Polish lyricist and translator Ernest Bryll).

Track listing

All music and lyrics by Myslovitz, except track 1 (music by Marek Jałowiecki, lyrics by Turlough O'Carolan), track 7 (music and lyrics by Marek Jałowiecki), track 9 (music by Jerzy Kossela, lyrics by Krzysztof Klenczon), track 10 (lyrics by Marcin Porczek) and track 11 (music and lyrics by David Bowie).
"Peggy Brown"
"Blue Velvet"
"Z twarzą Marilyn Monroe" (With a Face Like Marilyn Monroe)
"Jim Best"
"Amfetaminowa siostra" (Amphetamine sister)
"Pierwszy raz (z Michelle J.)" (My first time with Michelle J.)
"Bunt szesnastolatki" (A rebellion of sixteen years old girl)
"Funny Hill"
"Historia jednej znajomości" (The history of a certain acquaintance)
"Good Day My Angel"
"Memory of a Free Festival"

Personnel 

Myslovitz:
 Artur Rojek - lead vocal, guitars
 Przemysław Myszor - guitars, keyboards
 Wojciech Powaga - guitars
 Jacek Kuderski - bass guitar, backing vocals, lead vocal on "Bunt szesnastolatki"
 Wojciech Kuderski - drums

and also:
 Andrzej Smolik - keyboards
 Ian Harris - lead vocals on track 10
 Andrzej Paweł Wojciechowski - producer

1996 albums
Myslovitz albums